"Up and Away (The Helicopter Song)" was a number one single in the Republic of Ireland for the Irish traditional folk band the Wolfe Tones.

Background
Originally written by Sean McGinley from Castlefin, County Donegal, the song tells the story of the 1973 escape of three Provisional Irish Republican Army (IRA) prisoners from Dublin's Mountjoy Prison. On Hallowe'en, an IRA member hijacked a helicopter and forced the pilot to fly to Mountjoy where the three prisoners, JB O'Hagan, Seamus Twomey and Kevin Mallon, were lifted by helicopter from the exercise yard of Mountjoy Jail's D Wing at 3.40pm. The incident was a major embarrassment for the government.

Lyrics and style

As with some other Wolfe Tones songs, the lyrics use a certain comical tone to show sympathy with the Irish republican cause and narrate events linked to the Troubles in Ireland without using aggressive or sectarian language, an attribute which contributed to its popularity.

Chart success
The song was immediately prohibited from being played on RTÉ stations or was severely restricted, sources vary. Despite that, the song sold 12,000 single records in the first week of release, taking it to the number one position in the Irish Singles Chart on November 22, 1973, and held that position for four weeks, until it was replaced by Slade's Merry Christmas Everybody.

References

1973 songs
Helicopter history
Irish folk songs
Provisional Irish Republican Army
Songs about The Troubles (Northern Ireland)